Earth Afire is a science fiction novel by American writers Orson Scott Card and Aaron Johnston, and the second book of the Formic Wars novels in the Ender's Game series. It was nominated for the Goodreads Choice Award for science fiction.

Plot

A century before the events of Ender's Game, an alien spaceship enters the solar system and soon makes known its hostile intentions by destroying harmless human ships. Then, it wipes out a ragtag fleet of asteroid miners who have banded together in a desperate attempt to stop it. All of the adult male members of Victor Delgado's extended clan die in the battle. The survivors are unable to transmit a warning, so Victor volunteers for a near-suicidal mission to try to reach Earth in a tiny, hastily converted unmanned cargo ship. He makes it to the Moon, but is unable to get the authorities to take him seriously. Thus, humanity is totally unprepared when the First Formic War starts.

The invader sends three enormous landing craft to southeast China. The Formics emerge and use gas to defoliate the area and kill everyone. Despite suffering stupendous losses, the suspicious Chinese government refuses outside help.

Before the landing, Mazer Rackham had been training the Chinese military on a new transport aircraft, the HERC, in exchange for training on their new invention, drill sledges that can tunnel quickly underground. During the Formic invasion, he saves Bingwen, a very intelligent eight-year-old Chinese boy, but is then shot down. Bingwen saves his life, with the remote help of Mazer's romantic interest, Kim. Bingwen and Mazer then set off to destroy the nearest Formic lander.

The Mobile Operations Police (MOP), a small but elite international force, enters China (without official authorization). The MOPs save Bingwen and Mazer from a Formic attack. The lander is heavily shielded, but it does not extend underground. Mazer manages to find some drill sledges and HERCs to transport them close to the lander. MOP Captain Wit O'Toole obtains a tactical nuclear weapon from anonymous Chinese who do not agree with their government's stance on foreign assistance. They destroy the lander, but then Captain Shenzu arrives and places Mazer under arrest.

Meanwhile, Victor and Imala (a Customs Agent assigned to Victor upon his unauthorized arrival) manage to drift close to the Formic ship, using a disguised ship provided by Lem Jukes (the only son of the richest man alive) to avoid being destroyed. Victor breaks into the alien ship through a gun port.

Characters 
Victor Delgado, a young mechanic of great talent who, along with his father and a young apprentice, keeps the family mining ship El Cavador running
Rena Delgado, Victor's mother
Lem Jukes, son of mining magnate Ukko Jukes and captain of the Makarhu, a corporate mining vessel
Captain DeWitt Clinton O'Toole, commander of the Mobile Operations Police (MOPs)
Lieutenant Mazer Rackham, a Maori soldier whom O'Toole is interested in recruiting
Bingwen, a young child whose parents and grandfather are killed in the Formic invasion
Ukko Jukes, Lem Jukes' father
Imala Bootstamp, Victor's Luna Trade Department representative and auditor
Captain Shenzu, a Chinese military officer

See also

The Formic Wars: Burning Earth
List of Ender's Game characters
List of works by Orson Scott Card

References 

2013 American novels
American science fiction novels
Ender's Game series books
Tor Books books
Alien invasions in novels
Space exploration novels